Slick Chick is a nickname that can refer to:
 The Slick Chick, a "Merrie Melodies" cartoon animated short
 Slick Chick (pinball), a 1963 pinball machine
 RF-100A, a 1954 jet fighter aircraft
a Texas Holdem poker hand consisting of an ace and a queen

See also 
 Slick Chicks, an underwear company